A Nice Neighbor is a 1979 Hungarian drama film directed by Zsolt Kézdi-Kovács. It competed in the Un Certain Regard section of the 1979 Cannes Film Festival.

Cast
 László Szabó - Dibusz Miklós
 Margit Dajka - Iduka
 Lajos Szabó - Okolicsni Feri bácsi
 Ági Margittay - Hajdúné (as Margittai Ági)
 Ágnes Kakassy - Erzsi (as Kakssy Ági)
 Csilla Herczeg - Bea
 Bertalan Solti - A tanár úr
 Ferenc Bencze - Szerelõ
 János Csapó - Hajdú
 László Paál - Svajda
 Sándor Szakácsi - Szerelõ
 József Almási - (as Almássy József)
 Léna Darás
 György Dörner - Bea élettársa
 Ilona Gurnik - Saci

References

External links

1979 films
Hungarian drama films
1970s Hungarian-language films
1979 drama films
Films directed by Zsolt Kézdi-Kovács